Tulita Airport  is located adjacent to Tulita, Northwest Territories, Canada. Its hours of operation are Monday to Friday from 9am to 5pm. The airport does operate outside of its operational hours when responding to MEDIVAC (air ambulance) call out.

Airlines and destinations

Cargo

References

External links

Certified airports in the Sahtu Region